Whitehorse Mountain is a peak near the western edge of the North Cascades in Washington state. It is located just southwest of the Sauk River Valley town of Darrington, near the northern boundary of Boulder River Wilderness in Mount Baker-Snoqualmie National Forest. While not of particularly high absolute elevation, even for the North Cascades, it is notable for its large, steep local relief. For example, its north face rises 6,000 feet (1,830 m) in only 1.8 mi (2.9 km).

The first recorded climb of Whitehorse Mountain was made in 1909 by Nels Bruseth. The standard route on the peak is via the Northwest Shoulder, which begins with a difficult trail hike, involves a good deal of snow climbing, and culminates with some exposed scrambling, . Other routes include the Whitehorse Glacier on the north side of the peak, the East Ridge, and the Southeast Ridge.

The mountain was known as "So-bahli-ahli" in the Lushootseed language used by local Coast Salish tribes, meaning a "lofty lady from the east". It was named by Darrington postmaster W. C. Hiles in 1894, who noted that a snowpatch on the mountain resembled a white horse owned by pioneer Fred Olds that the townspeople were searching for.

Whitehorse Mountain appears in the movie War Games starring Matthew Broderick. In the scene Matthew Broderick's character is seen using a pay phone at a gas station with Whitehorse Mountain in the background.

References

External links
 
 
 
 
 

Mountains of Washington (state)
Mountains of Snohomish County, Washington